Neil William McGowan (born 15 April 1977 in Glasgow) is a Scottish professional footballer who is currently player/first-team coach in the Scottish Juniors with Troon.

Playing career
McGowan was signed by Queen of the South manager Gordon Chisholm in 2007 and was primarily a centre back, who could also play full back. When signing for the Doonhamers, McGowan had already played for six other clubs that included Stranraer, Albion Rovers, Oxford United, Clydebank, KA Akureyri (Iceland) and Airdrie United.

McGowan then signed for Ayr United on 25 January 2008.

McGowan then signed for Clyde F.C., who his father (also named Neil) had played for in the late Sixties and early Seventies, in the January 2010 transfer window and he stayed at the Bully Wer until May 2011, after making 48 appearances in all competitions.

After his release from the Cumbernauld club, McGowan joined his brother Chris at Irvine Meadow.

McGowan then signed for Troon in the summer of 2013 and was part of the West of Scotland Super League First Division winning team in season 2013–14. McGowan was then appointed player-coach in May 2015.

Coaching career
McGowan started his coaching career when he joined Ayr United and worked as the club's under 19s coach at Somerset Park and was then appointed player-coach of Troon in May 2015 under Jimmy Kirkwood.

Notes

External links

1977 births
Troon F.C. players
Airdrieonians F.C. players
Albion Rovers F.C. players
Association football defenders
Ayr United F.C. players
Clyde F.C. players
Clydebank F.C. (1965) players
Knattspyrnufélag Akureyrar players
Expatriate footballers in Iceland
Living people
Oxford United F.C. players
Queen of the South F.C. players
Scottish expatriate footballers
Scottish Football League players
Scottish footballers
Scottish Junior Football Association players
Stranraer F.C. players
Scottish expatriate sportspeople in Iceland
Irvine Meadow XI F.C. players